South Africa competed at the 2020 Winter Youth Olympics in Lausanne, Switzerland from 9 to 22 January 2020.

South Africa's team consisted of two athletes (one male and one female) competing in alpine skiing. Thabo Rateleki served as the country's flag bearer during the opening ceremony.

Alpine skiing

See also
South Africa at the 2020 Summer Olympics

References

2020 in South African sport
Nations at the 2020 Winter Youth Olympics
South Africa at the Youth Olympics